Laird Doyle (1907–1936) was an American screenwriter. Doyle was under contract to Warner Brothers during the mid-1930s, before his sudden death at the age of twenty-nine. One of his final films was the British comedy Strangers on Honeymoon. Some of his screenplay work was used posthumously, his last credited film being in 1947.

Filmography
 Hell Below (1933)
 Jimmy the Gent (1934)
 The Key (1934)
 British Agent (1934)
 Bordertown (1935)
 Front Page Woman (1935)
 Special Agent (1935)
 Dangerous (1935)
 Strangers on Honeymoon (1936)
 Hearts Divided (1936)
 Cain and Mabel (1936)
 The Prince and the Pauper (1937)
 San Quentin (1937)
 Another Dawn (1937)
 Singapore Woman (1941) 
 Northwest Outpost (1947)

References

Bibliography
 Brown, Geoff. Launder and Gilliat. British Film Institute, 1977.

External links

1907 births
1936 deaths
20th-century American screenwriters